Eros, in comics, may refer to:

 Eros, a Marvel Comics character and Eternal better known as Starfox (comics)
 Eros (DC Comics), a DC Comics character, child of Ares and enemy of Wonder Woman

See also
Eros Comix, a line of pornographic comic books published by Fantagraphics
Eros (disambiguation)

References